The Cheshire 14 is an American catamaran sailing dinghy that was designed by Frank Meldau as a racer and first built in 1962.

The design is the smaller stablemate of the Isotope catamaran.

Production
The design is built by Fiberglass Unlimited, now called Custom Fiberglass International, in Wake Forest, North Carolina, United States and remains in production. By 1994 it was reported that 500 boats had been built.

Design
The Cheshire 14 is a recreational sailboat, with the hulls built predominantly of fiberglass with internal tubular frames. The hulls are connected by three tubular aluminum cross-members, which also support the mainsheet traveler, the mast and the forestay respectively. The boat has a fractional sloop rig with a rotating mast and anodized aluminum spars. The hulls have spooned raked stems , vertical transoms, dual transom-hung rudders controlled by a tiller and dual retractable centerboards. the boat displaces .

For sailing the design is equipped with a righting bar, roller furling jib, sail battens made of ash wood and positive flotation. Optional equipment includes a trapeze and fiberglass battens.

The design has a Portsmouth Yardstick racing average handicap of 80.0. The boat can accommodate three adults, but is normally raced by one sailor.

Operational history
In a 1994 review Richard Sherwood wrote, "the Cheshire catamaran predates the Hobie and has been in production for almost 20 years. The pivoting centerboards are unique to the Cheshire and its sister, the Isotope. The boards are easier to retract than daggerboards."

See also
List of sailing boat types

Related designs
Isotope (catamaran)

References

External links

Dinghies
Catamarans
1960s sailboat type designs
Sailboat type designs by Frank Meldau
Sailboat types built by Custom Fiberglass International
Sailboat types built by Fiberglass Unlimited